Saphenista absidata is a species of moth of the family Tortricidae. It was described by Józef Razowski in 1994. It is found in Sinaloa, Mexico.

References

Saphenista
Moths described in 1994
Taxa named by Józef Razowski
Moths of North America